Heaton  is a ward within the City of Bradford Metropolitan District Council, West Yorkshire, England. The population at the 2001 census was 16,913, which had increased to 17,121 at the 2011 Census. Historically part of the West Riding of Yorkshire, the ward includes the villages of Frizinghall, Heaton and Daisy Hill, extending to Chellow Heights Reservoir on the western edge and the Bradford-Shipley railway line on the eastern edge. Frizinghall railway station is on the edge of the ward.

The University of Bradford School of Management is located in Heaton, as is the former St Bede's Grammar School (now St Bede's and St Joseph's Catholic College Ardor Site) and Bradford Grammar School. The official residence of the Bishop of Bradford is also in Heaton. Heaton has three public houses and a range of shops and restaurants. An ancient woodland, Heaton Woods, stretches from the village to Shipley. The ward is home to 5 golf courses.

J.B. Priestley grew up in Heaton and John Braine attended St. Bede's Grammar School. The area became infamous in 1981 when Peter Sutcliffe, the "Yorkshire Ripper", who lived at 6 Garden Lane, was arrested.

Heaton is one of the few remaining places in England to have a Lord of the Manor. The title was until 2012 held by John Stanley King who purchased the title in the 1960s from the estate of the Earl of Rosse to ensure the ancient title remained live. He lived in the village all his life and was a local historian. The title is now held by his nephew, Christopher Ball.

Councillors 
Heaton electoral ward is represented on Bradford Council by three Labour Party councillors, Nussrat Mohammed, Mohammed Amran and Mohammad Shabbir.

 indicates seat up for re-election.
 indicates councillor defection.

See also
Listed buildings in Bradford (Heaton Ward)

References

External links 

 BCSP (Internet Explorer only)
 BBC election results
 Council ward profile (pdf)
 
 Heaton Woods Trust
 Heaton News and Gossip
 Heaton Blogger
 Kings Arms.

Areas of Bradford
Wards of Bradford